Slobodan Jovanović was a Croatian rower. He competed in the men's eight event at the 1948 Summer Olympics.

References

External links
 

Year of birth missing
Possibly living people
Croatian male rowers
Olympic rowers of Yugoslavia
Rowers at the 1948 Summer Olympics
Place of birth missing